Queen Blessing Ebigieson (born 14 April 1980) is a Nigerian veteran actress and filmmaker. She won the Best Actress (Indigenous) award and the Best Film (Indigenous) award for her production of Ileri Ife at the 2016 Eko International Film Festival. She received the Special Recognition Award at the 2021 City People Movie Awards for her contributions to the Nigerian movie industry.

Early life
Queen Blessing Ebigieson is a native of Okpella, Edo State, Nigeria. She was born in Benue State and raised in the Northern part of Nigeria. She attended Federal Polytechnic Bida, where she obtained a degree in mass communication in 2006. She received honorary doctorate degree in administration (decision making process) from Rescue Mission Theological University in 2022.

Career 
Queen Blessing Ebigieson started her career as a dancer and later went into modelling. She started acting in 2000 as an undergraduate. Her first film is Ashes to Ashes in Enugu State where she acted three scenes in the movie.

She has appeared in movies such as Eldorado, Girls Next Door, Back 2 Back, Empty Coffin and soap operas such as Wale Adenuga's Super Story. Since her rise to fame, she proceeded to act in over 80 movies. She owns BQ Productions and has produced up to ten films since 2009 such as Borokini, Ife Otito, Ejomiko, Ileri Ife, Ibaje Mi Dewa, Fix it or Kill it and Hatred.

She runs Queen Blessing Foundation (QBF) and also an National Drug Law Enforcement Agency Celebrity Drug Free Club ambassador. She has been serving as the 7th National Vice President of the Association of Movie Producers of Nigeria (AMP) since 2020.

Personal life 
Queen Blessing Ebigieson has a son with John Okosun of Reality Magazine and five adopted daughters. She is a practicing Christian.

Filmography 

 Super Story
 Empty Coffin
 Back 2 Back
 Girls Next Door
 Pretty Angels
 Romantic Touch
 Evil Genius
 Ejomiko
 Eldorado
 Sweet Love
 Moment of Joy
 Aje Ni Mope
 Romantic Attraction
 Omo Butty
 Ashes to Ashes (2000)

References 

Living people
Actresses from Edo State
Yoruba actresses
Nigerian actresses
1980 births